The 2010–11 Milwaukee Bucks season was the 43rd season of the franchise in the National Basketball Association (NBA).

Key dates
 June 24 – The 2010 NBA draft was held in New York City.
 July 1 – The free agency period begun.

Draft picks

Roster

Pre-season

Game log

|- bgcolor="#ccffcc"
| 1
| October 5
| Chicago
| 
| Earl Boykins (14)
| Jon Brockman (8)
| Brandon Jennings (5)
| Bradley Center10,964
| 1–0
|- bgcolor="#ffcccc"
| 2
| October 8
| @ Detroit
| 
| Brandon Jennings,Ersan İlyasova,Chris Douglas-Roberts (18)
| Larry Sanders (9)
| Earl Boykins (7)
| The Palace of Auburn Hills12,821
| 1–1
|- bgcolor="#ccffcc"
| 3
| October 9
| Charlotte
| 
| Brandon Jennings (18)
| Drew Gooden (9)
| Earl Boykins (4)
| Resch Center5,467
| 2–1
|- bgcolor="#ccffcc"
| 4
| October 14
| @ Washington
| 
| Drew Gooden (25)
| Ersan İlyasova (8)
| Brandon Jennings (7)
| Verizon Center9,263
| 3–1
|- bgcolor="#ffcccc"
| 5
| October 16
| @ Memphis
| 
| Drew Gooden (13)
| Brian Skinner (8)
| Carlos Delfino (4)
| FedExForum9,767
| 3–2
|- bgcolor="#ffcccc"
| 6
| October 17
| @ Minnesota
| 
| Ersan İlyasova (22)
| Brian Skinner (8)
| Brandon Jennings,Ersan İlyasova (4)
| Sioux Falls Arena5,102
| 3–3
|- bgcolor="#ffcccc"
| 7
| October 21
| @ Cleveland
| 
| Chris Douglas-Roberts (16)
| Ersan İlyasova (8)
| Brandon Jennings (7)
| Value City Arena7,092
| 3–4
|- bgcolor="#ffcccc"
| 8
| October 22
| Minnesota
| 
| Carlos Delfino (18)
| Carlos Delfino,Chris Douglas-Roberts,Ersan İlyasova,Larry Sanders (8)
| Carlos Delfino (8)
| Bradley Center11,624
| 3–5
|-

Regular season

Standings

Record vs. opponents

Game log

|- bgcolor="#ffcccc"
| 1
| October 27
| @ New Orleans
| 
| Carlos Delfino (19)
| Andrew Bogut (15)
| Brandon Jennings (10)
| New Orleans Arena15,039
| 0–1
|- bgcolor="#ffcccc"
| 2
| October 29    
| @ Minnesota
| 
| Corey Maggette (23)
| Andrew Bogut (10)
| Brandon Jennings (7)
| Target Center17,197
| 0–2
|- bgcolor="#ccffcc"
| 3
| October 30
| Charlotte
| 
| Carlos Delfino (23)
| Brandon Jennings (10)
| Brandon Jennings (10)
| Bradley Center16,519
| 1–2
|-

|- bgcolor="#ffcccc"
| 4
| November 2
| Portland
| 
| Corey Maggette (16)
| Andrew Bogut (9)
| Brandon Jennings (7)
| Bradley Center13,087
| 1–3
|- bgcolor="#ffcccc"
| 5
| November 3
| @ Boston
| 
| Andrew Bogut (21)
| Andrew Bogut (13)
| Carlos Delfino (7)
| TD Garden18,624
| 1–4
|- bgcolor="#ccffcc"
| 6
| November 5
| @ Indiana
| 
| John Salmons (22)
| Luc Mbah a Moute (15)
| John Salmons (5)
| Conseco Fieldhouse14,115
| 2–4
|- bgcolor="#ffcccc"
| 7
| November 6
| New Orleans
| 
| Andrew Bogut (19)
| Andrew Bogut (14)
| Brandon Jennings (5)
| Bradley Center16,731
| 2–5
|- bgcolor="#ccffcc"
| 8
| November 9
| New York
| 
| Brandon Jennings (19)
| Ersan İlyasova (9)
| Brandon Jennings (6)
| Bradley Center13,286
| 3–5
|- bgcolor="#ccffcc"
| 9
| November 10
| @ Atlanta
| 
| Corey Maggette (20)
| Drew Gooden,Ersan İlyasova (10)
| Earl Boykins (8)
| Philips Arena11,211
| 4–5
|- bgcolor="#ccffcc"
| 10
| November 13
| Golden State
| 
| John Salmons (26)
| Andrew Bogut (17)
| Brandon Jennings (6)
| Bradley Center17,049
| 5–5
|- bgcolor="#ffcccc"
| 11
| November 16
| L.A. Lakers
| 
| Brandon Jennings (31)
| Andrew Bogut (18)
| Brandon Jennings,John Salmons (6)
| Bradley Center18,059
| 5–6
|- bgcolor="#ffcccc"
| 12
| November 19
| @ Philadelphia
| 
| Corey Maggette (20)
| Drew Gooden,John Salmons (8)
| Earl Boykins,Brandon Jennings,John Salmons (4)
| Wells Fargo Center14,557
| 5–7
|- bgcolor="#ffcccc"
| 13
| November 20
| Oklahoma City
| 
| Brandon Jennings (25)
| Drew Gooden (16)
| Brandon Jennings (3)
| Bradley Center16,975
| 5–8
|- bgcolor="#ffcccc"
| 14
| November 24
| @ Cleveland
| 
| Keyon Dooling (18)
| Drew Gooden,Luc Mbah a Moute (9)
| Keyon Dooling (5)
| Quicken Loans Arena20,562
| 5–9
|- bgcolor="#ffcccc"
| 15
| November 26
| @ Detroit
| 
| Brandon Jennings (25)
| Ersan İlyasova (11)
| Brandon Jennings (6)
| The Palace of Auburn Hills17,133
| 5–10
|- bgcolor="#ccffcc"
| 16
| November 27
| Charlotte
| 
| Brandon Jennings (32)
| Luc Mbah a Moute (10)
| Brandon Jennings,John Salmons (7)
| Bradley Center15,213
| 6–10
|- bgcolor="#ffcccc"
| 17
| November 29
| @ Utah
| 
| Brandon Jennings (27)
| Ersan İlyasova (6)
| Keyon Dooling,Brandon Jennings,John Salmons (4)
| EnergySolutions Arena18,497
| 6–11
|-

|- bgcolor="#ffcccc"
| 18
| December 1
| @ Denver
| 
| John Salmons (21)
| Larry Sanders (10)
| Chris Douglas-Roberts,Ersan İlyasova,Brandon Jennings,Corey Maggette (4)
| Pepsi Center14,221
| 6–12
|- bgcolor="#ccffcc"
| 19
| December 4
| Orlando
| 
| Andrew Bogut (31)
| Andrew Bogut (18)
| Brandon Jennings (6)
| Bradley Center16,218
| 7–12
|- bgcolor="#ffcccc"
| 20
| December 6
| Miami
| 
| Corey Maggette (20)
| Andrew Bogut (13)
| John Salmons (4)
| Bradley Center17,167
| 7–13
|- bgcolor="#ccffcc"
| 21
| December 8
| Indiana
| 
| Brandon Jennings (22)
| Andrew Bogut (11)
| Brandon Jennings,John Salmons (4)
| Bradley Center12,789
| 8–13
|- bgcolor="#ccffcc"
| 22
| December 10
| Houston
| 
| Andrew Bogut (24)
| Andrew Bogut (22)
| John Salmons (5)
| Bradley Center14,526
| 9–13
|- bgcolor="#ccffcc"
| 23
| December 13
| @ Dallas
| 
| Brandon Jennings (23)
| Andrew Bogut (14)
| Brandon Jennings (10)
| American Airlines Center19,720
| 10–13
|- bgcolor="#ffcccc"
| 24
| December 15
| @ San Antonio
| 
| Chris Douglas-Roberts (21)
| Drew Gooden (11)
| Brandon Jennings (7)
| AT&T Center12,514
| 10–14
|- bgcolor="#ffcccc"
| 25
| December 18
| Utah
| 
| Andrew Bogut (19)
| Andrew Bogut (9)
| Keyon Dooling (5)
| Bradley Center16,004
| 10–15
|- bgcolor="#ffcccc"
| 26
| December 20
| @ Portland
| 
| John Salmons (23)
| Luc Mbah a Moute (7)
| Keyon Dooling (5)
| Rose Garden20,406
| 10–16
|- bgcolor="#ccffcc"
| 27
| December 21
| @ L.A. Lakers
| 
| Earl Boykins (22)
| Ersan İlyasova (11)
| John Salmons (6)
| Staples Center18,997
| 11–16
|- bgcolor="#ccffcc"
| 28
| December 23
| @ Sacramento
| 
| Earl Boykins (19)
| Andrew Bogut (13)
| John Salmons (6)
| ARCO Arena12,360
| 12–16
|- bgcolor="#ffcccc"
| 29
| December 27
| Atlanta
| 
| John Salmons (18)
| Andrew Bogut (11)
| Keyon Dooling (9)
| Bradley Center16,751
| 12–17
|- bgcolor="#ffcccc"
| 30
| December 28
| @ Chicago
| 
| John Salmons (18)
| Andrew Bogut (16)
| Keyon Dooling (6)
| United Center22,091
| 12–18
|-

|- bgcolor="#ccffcc"
| 31
| January 1
| Dallas
| 
| Earl Boykins (26)
| Ersan İlyasova (17)
| Earl Boykins (6)
| Bradley Center13,194
| 13–18
|- bgcolor="#ffcccc"
| 32
| January 4
| @ Miami
| 
| John Salmons (18)
| Andrew Bogut (8)
| John Salmons (6)
| American Airlines Arena20,215
| 13–19
|- bgcolor="#ffcccc"
| 33
| January 5
| @ Orlando
| 
| Corey Maggette (21)
| Larry Sanders (8)
| Andrew Bogut,Earl Boykins,Keyon Dooling (2)
| Amway Center18,846
| 13–20
|- bgcolor="#ffcccc"
| 34
| January 7
| Miami
| 
| Chris Douglas-Roberts (30)
| Andrew Bogut (27)
| Keyon Dooling (7)
| Bradley Center18,717
| 13–21
|- bgcolor="#ccffcc"
| 35
| January 8
| @ New Jersey
| 
| Chris Douglas-Roberts (24)
| Ersan İlyasova (13)
| Keyon Dooling (7)
| Prudential Center12,898
| 14–21
|- bgcolor="#ffcccc"
| 36
| January 12
| San Antonio
| 
| John Salmons (17)
| Andrew Bogut (14)
| Keyon Dooling (6)
| Bradley Center14,061
| 14–22
|- bgcolor="#ffcccc"
| 37
| January 14
| @ Philadelphia
| 
| Corey Maggette (16)
| Andrew Bogut (12)
| Earl Boykins (11)
| Wells Fargo Center12,650
| 14–23
|- bgcolor="#ffcccc"
| 38
| January 17
| @ Houston
| 
| Corey Maggette (25)
| Drew Gooden (11)
| Earl Boykins (6)
| Toyota Center16,186
| 14–24
|- bgcolor="#ccffcc"
| 39
| January 19
| Washington
| 
| Keyon Dooling (23)
| Andrew Bogut,Ersan İlyasova (9)
| Earl Boykins,Corey Maggette (4)
| Bradley Center14,007
| 15–24
|- bgcolor="#ccffcc"
| 40
| January 21
| @ Cleveland
| 
| Andrew Bogut (23)
| Luc Mbah a Moute (9)
| Keyon Dooling (11)
| Quicken Loans Arena20,562
| 16–24
|- bgcolor="#ffcccc"
| 41
| January 22
| Memphis
| 
| Earl Boykins (23)
| Andrew Bogut (9)
| Corey Maggette (5)
| Bradley Center16,157
| 16–25
|- bgcolor="#ffcccc"
| 42
| January 24
| @ Chicago
| 
| Chris Douglas-Roberts (30)
| Andrew Bogut (18)
| Keyon Dooling (10)
| United Center21,126
| 16–26
|- bgcolor="#ccffcc"
| 43
| January 26
| Atlanta
| 
| Corey Maggette (22)
| Andrew Bogut (14)
| Keyon Dooling (5)
| Bradley Center13,274
| 17–26
|- bgcolor="#ccffcc"
| 44
| January 28
| @ Toronto
| 
| Corey Maggette (29)
| Corey Maggette (11)
| Carlos Delfino (6)
| Air Canada Centre15,159
| 18–26
|- bgcolor="#ccffcc"
| 45
| January 29
| New Jersey
| 
| Carlos Delfino (21)
| Andrew Bogut (18)
| Keyon Dooling (9)
| Bradley Center17,173
| 19–26
|- bgcolor="#ffcccc"
| 46
| January 31
| @ L.A. Clippers
| 
| Corey Maggette (25)
| Andrew Bogut (11)
| Keyon Dooling (8)
| Staples Center17,218
| 19–27
|-

|- bgcolor="#ffcccc"
| 47
| February 2
| @ Phoenix
| 
| Ersan İlyasova,Corey Maggette (15)
| Ersan İlyasova (9)
| Brandon Jennings (5)
| US Airways Center16,422
| 19–28
|- bgcolor="#ffcccc"
| 48
| February 3
| @ Golden State
| 
| Ersan İlyasova (23)
| Luc Mbah a Moute (19)
| Keyon Dooling (9)
| Oracle Arena18,008
| 19–29
|- bgcolor="#ffcccc"
| 49
| February 5
| Detroit
| 
| Andrew Bogut (18)
| Andrew Bogut,Ersan İlyasova (9)
| Brandon Jennings (5)
| Bradley Center15,791
| 19–30
|- bgcolor="#ccffcc"
| 50
| February 8
| Toronto
| 
| John Salmons (17)
| Luc Mbah a Moute (14)
| Keyon Dooling (5)
| Bradley Center11,975
| 20–30
|- bgcolor="#ffcccc"
| 51
| February 9
| @ Washington
| 
| Brandon Jennings (20)
| Andrew Bogut (11)
| Andrew Bogut,Brandon Jennings,Keyon Dooling (4)
| Verizon Center16,108
| 20–31
|- bgcolor="#ffcccc"
| 52
| February 11
| @ Memphis
| 
| Corey Maggette (22)
| Andrew Bogut (14)
| John Salmons (6)
| FedExForum14,749
| 20–32
|- bgcolor="#ffcccc"
| 53
| February 12
| Indiana
| 
| Carlos Delfino (21)
| Andrew Bogut (12)
| Carlos Delfino (5)
| Bradley Center17,046
| 20–33
|- bgcolor="#ccffcc"
| 54
| February 14
| L.A. Clippers
| 
| Carlos Delfino (26)
| Luc Mbah a Moute (10)
| John Salmons (12)
| Bradley Center13,111
| 21–33
|- bgcolor="#ffcccc"
| 55
| February 16
| Denver
| 
| John Salmons (33)
| Andrew Bogut (20)
| Earl Boykins (5)
| Bradley Center16,033
| 21–34
|- align="center"
|colspan="9" bgcolor="#bbcaff"|All-Star Break
|- bgcolor="#ccffcc"
| 56
| February 22
| Minnesota
| 
| Brandon Jennings (27)
| Jon Brockman (14)
| Brandon Jennings (7)
| Bradley Center13,106
| 22–34
|- bgcolor="#ffcccc"
| 57
| February 23
| @ New York
| 
| John Salmons (27)
| Andrew Bogut (12)
| John Salmons (7)
| Madison Square Garden19,763
| 22–35
|- bgcolor="#ffcccc"
| 58
| February 26
| Chicago
| 
| Luc Mbah a Moute (16)
| Andrew Bogut (16)
| Andrew Bogut,Carlos Delfino,Brandon Jennings,Corey Maggette (2)
| Bradley Center18,717
| 22–36
|-

|- bgcolor="#ccffcc"
| 59
| March 1
| Detroit
| 
| Brandon Jennings (21)
| Carlos Delfino (10)
| Carlos Delfino,Brandon Jennings (4)
| Bradley Center11,364
| 23–36
|- bgcolor="#ffcccc"
| 60
| March 4
| Phoenix
| 
| Corey Maggette (21)
| Carlos Delfino,Corey Maggette (9)
| Earl Boykins,Carlos Delfino,John Salmons (3)
| Bradley Center15,011
| 23–37
|- bgcolor="#ffcccc"
| 61
| March 6
| Boston
| 
| Brandon Jennings (23)
| Jon Brockman (9)
| John Salmons (6)
| Bradley Center16,110
| 23–38
|- bgcolor="#ccffcc"
| 62
| March 8
| @ Washington
| 
| Brandon Jennings (23)
| Andrew Bogut (9)
| Andrew Bogut (7)
| Verizon Center16,190
| 24–38
|- bgcolor="#ccffcc"
| 63
| March 9
| Cleveland
| 
| Earl Boykins,Brandon Jennings (18)
| Andrew Bogut (10)
| Keyon Dooling (5)
| Bradley Center12,497
| 25–38
|- bgcolor="#ccffcc"
| 64
| March 12
| Philadelphia
| 
| Andrew Bogut (17)
| Luc Mbah a Moute (12)
| Earl Boykins,John Salmons (7)
| Bradley Center15,832
| 26–38
|- bgcolor="#ffcccc"
| 65
| March 13
| @ Boston
| 
| Earl Barron (10)
| Andrew Bogut (8)
| Brandon Jennings (3)
| TD Garden18,624
| 26–39
|- bgcolor="#ffcccc"
| 66
| March 15
| @ Atlanta
| 
| Andrew Bogut (21)
| Andrew Bogut (13)
| Earl Barron,John Salmons (4)
| Philips Arena13,590
| 26–40
|- bgcolor="#ffcccc"
| 67
| March 16
| Orlando
| 
| Brandon Jennings (23)
| Jon Brockman (8)
| Brandon Jennings (8)
| Bradley Center13,831
| 26–41
|- bgcolor="#ccffcc"
| 68
| March 18
| New Jersey
| 
| Carlos Delfino (26)
| Carlos Delfino (8)
| Brandon Jennings (10)
| Bradley Center14,563
| 27–41
|- bgcolor="#ccffcc"
| 69
| March 20
| New York
| 
| Carlos Delfino (30)
| Andrew Bogut (12)
| Brandon Jennings (9)
| Bradley Center18,052
| 28–41
|- bgcolor="#ffcccc"
| 70
| March 23
| Sacramento
| 
| Carlos Delfino (30)
| Andrew Bogut (9)
| Brandon Jennings (6)
| Bradley Center14,122
| 28–42
|- bgcolor="#ccffcc"
| 71
| March 25
| @ New York
| 
| Brandon Jennings (37)
| Andrew Bogut (17)
| John Salmons (5)
| Madison Square Garden19,763
| 29–42
|- bgcolor="#ffcccc"
| 72
| March 26
| Chicago
| 
| John Salmons (25)
| Andrew Bogut (9)
| Brandon Jennings (5)
| Bradley Center18,717
| 29–43
|- bgcolor="#ffcccc"
| 73
| March 28
| @ Charlotte
| 
| Andrew Bogut,Brandon Jennings (26)
| Andrew Bogut,Brandon Jennings (9)
| John Salmons (6)
| Time Warner Cable Arena12,368
| 29–44
|- bgcolor="#ccffcc"
| 74
| March 30
| @ Toronto
| 
| Brandon Jennings (25)
| Drew Gooden (11)
| Brandon Jennings,John Salmons (7)
| Air Canada Centre15,906
| 30–44
|-

|- bgcolor="#ffcccc"
| 75
| April 1
| @ Indiana
| 
| Brandon Jennings (20)
| Drew Gooden (10)
| Keyon Dooling (4)
| Conseco Fieldhouse11,177
| 30–45
|- bgcolor="#ccffcc"
| 76
| April 2
| Philadelphia
| 
| John Salmons (19)
| Drew Gooden (12)
| John Salmons (8)
| Bradley Center17,079
| 31–45
|- bgcolor="#ffcccc"
| 77
| April 5
| @ Orlando
| 
| Drew Gooden (18)
| John Salmons (8)
| Drew Gooden (4)
| Amway Center18,996
| 31–46
|- bgcolor="#ccffcc"
| 78
| April 6
| @ Miami
| 
| John Salmons (17)
| Luc Mbah a Moute (12)
| Andrew Bogut,Brandon Jennings (4)
| American Airlines Arena20,017
| 32–46
|- bgcolor="#ffcccc"
| 79
| April 8
| @ Detroit
| 
| Brandon Jennings (31)
| Jon Brockman,Ersan İlyasova (6)
| Brandon Jennings (4)
| The Palace of Auburn Hills16,266
| 32–47
|- bgcolor="#ccffcc"
| 80
| April 9
| Cleveland
| 
| John Salmons (32)
| Drew Gooden (13)
| Drew Gooden (13)
| Bradley Center18,717
| 33–47
|- bgcolor="#ccffcc"
| 81
| April 11
| Toronto
| 
| John Salmons (24)
| Drew Gooden (11)
| Drew Gooden (5)
| Bradley Center13,279
| 34–47
|- bgcolor="#ccffcc"
| 82
| April 13
| @ Oklahoma City
| 
| Brandon Jennings (16)
| Ersan İlyasova (9)
| Brandon Jennings (7)
| Oklahoma City Arena18,203
| 35–47
|-

Player statistics

Season

|- align="center" bgcolor=""
| Andrew Bogut || 65 || 65 || 34.4 ||  .495 || .000 || .442 || style="background:#FF0000;color:white;"| 11.1 || 2.00 || 0.72 || style="background:#FF0000;color:white;"| 2.63 || 12.8
|- align="center" bgcolor="#f0f0f0"
| Earl Boykins || 57 || 0 || 15.1 || .443 || style="background:#FF0000;color:white;"| .380 || .841 || 1.00 || 2.5 || .67 || .05 || 7.2
|- align="center" bgcolor=""
| Jon Brockman || 63 || 6 || 10.7 ||style="background:#FF0000;color:white;"| .511 || .0 || .678 || 2.90 || 0.3 || .22 || .5 || 2.2
|- align="center" bgcolor="#f0f0f0"
| Carlos Delfino || 49 || 40 ||  32.4 || .390 || .370 || .800 || 4.1 || 2.3 || style="background:#FF0000;color:white;"| 1.55 || .16 || 11.5
|- align="center" bgcolor=""
| Keyon Dooling || style="background:#FF0000;color:white;"| 80 || 22 || 22.0 || .397 || .346 || .830 || 1.50 || 3.0 || .68 || .05 || 7.1
|- align="center" bgcolor="#f0f0f0"
| Chris Douglas-Roberts || 44 || 12 || 20.1 || .429 || .326 || .831 || 2.0 || 1.1 || .66 || .30 || 7.3
|- align="center" bgcolor=""
| Drew Gooden || 35 || 18 || 24.6 || .431 || .150 || .794 || 6.8 || 1.3 || .60 || .51 || 11.3
|- align="center" bgcolor="#f0f0f0"
| Ersan İlyasova || 60 || 34 || 25.1 || .436 || .298 || style="background:#FF0000;color:white;"| .894 || 6.1 || 0.9 || .85 || .40 || 9.5
|- align="center" bgcolor=""
| Brandon Jennings || 63 || 61 || 34.4 || .390 || .323 || .809 || 3.7 || style="background:#FF0000;color:white;"| 4.8 || 1.51 || .33 || style="background:#FF0000;color:white;"| 16.2
|- align="center" bgcolor="#f0f0f0"
| Corey Maggette || 67 || 18 || 20.9 || .453 || .359 || .834 || 3.6 || 1.3 || .31 || .07 || 12.0
|- align="center" bgcolor=""
| Luc Mbah a Moute || 79 || 52 || 26.5 || .463 || .000 || .707 || 5.30 || 0.9 || .91 || .35 || 6.7
|- align="center" bgcolor="#f0f0f0"
| Michael Redd || 10 || 0 || 13.4 || .400 || .235 || 1.0 || 0.80 || 1.2 || .2 || .1 || 4.4
|- align="center" bgcolor=""
| John Salmons || 73 || style="background:#FF0000;color:white;"| 70 || style="background:#FF0000;color:white;"|35.3 || .415 || .379 || .813 || 3.60 || 0.99 || 1.00 || .31 || 13.3
|- align="center" bgcolor="#f0f0f0"
| Larry Sanders || 60 || 12 || 14.5 || .433 || .0 || .560 || 3.0 || 0.3 || .37 || 1.20 || 4.3
|- align="center" bgcolor=""
| Brian Skinner || 2 || 0 || 3.0 || .0 || .0 || .0 || 0.0 || 0.0 || .0 || .0 || 0.0
|}
As of June 17, 2011.

Playoffs

Awards, records and milestones

Awards

Week/Month

All-Star

Season

Records

Milestones

Injuries and surgeries
Michael Redd suffered a torn ACL and MCL the previous season in a January 10 game against the Los Angeles Lakers. He is expected to be out until at least February.

Chris Douglas-Roberts missed the first fifteen games of the season after suffering a pre-season eye injury that required surgery. He has worn protective glasses since returning on November 27.

Carlos Delfino has been out indefinitely since the Bucks' November 6 loss to the New Orleans Hornets. He suffered a neck sprain and has been experiencing concussive symptoms.

Andrew Bogut missed five games due to back spasms. He made his return in a December 4 victory over the Orlando Magic.

Drew Gooden missed five games after suffering from plantar fasciitis in his left foot. He returned for the Bucks' December 13 victory over the Dallas Mavericks.

Corey Maggette is expected to be out until early January. A fall in the Bucks' December 18 loss to the Utah Jazz left him with concussive symptoms.

Brandon Jennings underwent surgery on December 20 to repair a fracture in his left foot. He is expected to miss four-to-six weeks.

Transactions

Trades

Free agents

Additions

Subtractions

References

Milwaukee Bucks seasons
Milwaukee
Milwaukee Bucks
Milwaukee Bucks